The Ghent Historic District in Ghent, Kentucky is a  historic district which was listed on the National Register of Historic Places in 1983.

It included 101 contributing buildings and four contributing sites in an area including, or roughly bounded by, U.S. Route 42, Fishing, Ann, Main Cross, Ferry, Water, Union, and Liberty Streets.

The district includes the town's historic core.

References

National Register of Historic Places in Carroll County, Kentucky
Georgian architecture in Kentucky
Buildings and structures completed in 1813
Historic districts on the National Register of Historic Places in Kentucky